Darren Jordan is a former professional rugby league footballer who played in the 2000s. During his formative years he was a local to the village of Ackworth in West Yorkshire, once known as the largest village in England by surface area.

References

External links
Millward proud of Cunningham
Young guns eye Saints

Living people
Doncaster R.L.F.C. players
English rugby league players
Place of birth missing (living people)
Rugby league hookers
Rugby league players from Yorkshire
Wakefield Trinity players
Year of birth missing (living people)